Mary Dillon (born 1961/62) is an American businesswoman and CEO of Foot Locker. She was the CEO of Ulta Beauty, a beauty retail company, from July 2013 until June 2021, when she became chair. She was global chief marketing officer and executive vice president of McDonald's from 2005 to 2010. She was CEO and president of U.S. Cellular from 2010 to 2013. Dillon is a non-executive director of Starbucks.

In May 2019, Dillon announced plans for Ulta to expand its business internationally, beginning with store openings in Canada.

Dillon has a bachelor's degree in Marketing and Asian Studies from the University of Illinois at Chicago.

Dillon was named one of Fortune's most powerful women in 2016. In 2016 she became a trustee of the Save the Children Federation. In October 2018, she was awarded the Sandra Taub Humanitarian Award for philanthropic leadership. In June 2019, Dillon was named one of Barron's best CEOs.

Early life 
Dillon was born in Chicago and is the fourth among six siblings. Her father worked as a steel worker while her mother was a housewife. She studied college at the University of Illinois and worked various jobs such as a waitress, a house cleaner, and a bank teller, to acquire money for her tuition. She earned her bachelor's degree in marketing in 1983.

References

1960s births
Starbucks people
Women corporate directors
American corporate directors
20th-century American businesspeople
20th-century American businesswomen
21st-century American businesspeople
21st-century American businesswomen
Living people
American women chief executives
University of Illinois Chicago alumni